A referendum on the Annan Plan was held in the Republic of Cyprus and the unrecognized Turkish Republic of Northern Cyprus on 24 April 2004. The two communities were asked whether they approved of the fifth revision of the United Nations proposal for reuniting the island, which had been divided since 1974. While it was approved by 65% of Turkish Cypriots, it was rejected by 76% of Greek Cypriots. Turnout for the referendum was high at 89% among Greek Cypriots and 87% among Turkish Cypriots, which was taken as indicative of great interest in the issue on the part of the electorates.

Background
The referendum had originally been planned for 21 April, until the UN planners realised it was the anniversary of the coup in Athens in 1967, which set off the chain of events that led to the Turkish invasion of the island in 1974.

Campaign

Republic of Cyprus
Political leaders in the Republic of Cyprus strongly opposed the plan. Tassos Papadopoulos, president of the Republic of Cyprus, spoke out against the plan in a speech broadcast live on television. Two days before the referendums, Cyprus's biggest party, Progressive Party of Working People, decided to reject the Annan Plan. Greek Prime Minister Kostas Karamanlis decided to maintain a "neutral" position over the plan, but opposition leader George Papandreou of PASOK urged Cypriots to vote in favour, also because the plan had been promoted by his political party while it was still in power and Papandreou had been the Foreign Minister at the time, and had claimed both communities were ready for "a final common agreement". Nevertheless,  opinion polls conducted in the Republic of Cyprus over the entire period of the negotiations from start to finish had always shown around 80% opposition to the proposals. Greek Cypriots have not voted uniformly on the Annan Plan.
Their voting behaviour was strongly depended on their partisanship and their location.

Turkish Republic of Northern Cyprus
Among Turkish Cypriots the plan was argued to be excessively pro-Greek, but most said they were willing to accept it as a means of ending their prolonged international isolation and exclusion from the wider European economy. However, it was opposed by their leadership, with the Turkish Cypriot President Rauf Denktaş actively advocating a no vote. However, his Prime Minister Mehmet Ali Talat favoured the plan's acceptance, while Turkish Prime Minister Recep Tayyip Erdoğan also supported it. Turkey saw a resolution of the Cyprus issue as being an essential first step to eventual Turkish membership of the EU as well as a way of defusing tensions with Greece.

The Grey Wolves (a Turkish right-wing nationalist group belonging to the MHP nationalist party) actively advocated a "no" vote. There were some limited riots caused by the Grey Wolves party activists against pro-ratification supporters during the pre-vote period. At least 50 such activists had arrived in Northern Cyprus during the pre-voting period. However, the referendum itself passed off peacefully and was deemed free and fair.

Referendum question
The question put to the electorate of the two communities was:

Results

Aftermath
Since the Greek Cypriot Community did not approve the Plan, and implementation of the Plan was dependent on its approval by both communities, the Annan Plan, according to its own terms, became null and void.

Participation issues
Greek Cypriots disputed the right of Turkish Cypriots who had immigrated from Turkey since the 1974 breakaway. Following the referendum, Greek Cypriot President Tassos Papadopoulos wrote to Kofi Annan, complaining that:

The British Foreign Affairs Select Committee noted that while the settler population did not "swing" the vote, "as illegal immigrants they should not have been allowed to vote at all".

Reaction

Greek Cypriots
The Republic of Cyprus' president, Tassos Papadopoulos, said that Greek Cypriots had rejected just the Annan plan and not all solutions to the Cyprus problem. "They are not turning their backs on their Turkish Cypriot compatriots," he said soon after the results were declared. "They have simply rejected this particular solution on offer."

Turkish Cypriots
Turkish Cypriot President Rauf Denktaş responded to the referendum outcome by saying that, with the Annan Plan rejected, his "no" campaign had reached its objective. He rejected calls for his immediate resignation, but announced the following month that he would not be standing for a fifth presidential term in 2005.

Greece, Turkey and the United Kingdom
There was varied reaction from Cyprus' Guarantor Powers, Greece, Turkey and the United Kingdom. Turkey's Prime Minister Recep Tayyip Erdoğan said that he believed the result spelled an end for Turkish Cypriot isolation, and that by rejecting the Annan Plan, "southern Cyprus (was) the loser". A spokesman for the Greek government stressed that efforts to reunite Cyprus should not be halted, pointing out that in the EU framework it is "in the interest of everyone to continue efforts to reconcile Greek Cypriots and Turkish Cypriots".

The British Foreign Secretary Jack Straw said, "We will respect the choice which Greek Cypriots have expressed today. But I hope that they will continue to reflect on whether this choice is the right one for them." The general international reaction to the result was similar to that of Britain: one of deep disappointment, particularly among those bodies that had worked on the Annan Plan and on EU accession arrangements.

European Union
The European Union had been counting on approval of the Annan Plan so that Cyprus would join it as a united island, and expressed disappointment at the Greek Cypriot rejection of the Plan. It had already agreed that the Republic of Cyprus would become a member regardless of the result of the referendum, and so on May 1, 2004, Cyprus joined the European Union together with nine other countries.

With regard to the Turkish Cypriots the European Union stated the following:

Had the plan been ratified by both sides, Cyprus would have entered the EU as the United Republic of Cyprus.

Other international reaction

United Nations Secretary-General Kofi Annan: "A unique and historic chance to resolve the Cyprus problem has been missed."
European Commission: "The European Commission deeply regrets that the Greek Cypriot community did not approve the comprehensive settlement of the Cyprus problem, but it respects the democratic decision of the people."
US State Department Spokesman Richard Boucher: "We are disappointed that a majority of Greek Cypriots voted against the settlement plan. Failure of the referendum in the Greek Cypriot community is a setback to the hopes of those on the island who voted for the settlement and to the international community."
European Commissioner for Enlargement Günter Verheugen: "I feel cheated by the Greek Cypriot government… There is a shadow now over the accession of Cyprus. What we will seriously consider now is finding a way to end the economic isolation of the Turkish Cypriots."
UN Special Envoy Álvaro de Soto: "This evening I'm biting my tongue."

References

External links
No to the Annan Plan Campaign against the Annan Plan
Oxi sto Sxedio Anan Campaign against the Annan Plan 
The UN Annan Plan Proposal For the settlement of the Cyprus question legal analysis of the Annan Plan
Le Monde Diplomatique Implications for the "No" Vote in Cyprus
Press Release UK Foreign and Commonwealth Office

2004 referendums
Referendum
Referendums in Northern Cyprus
Referendum
Referendum
Referendum
Cyprus peace process